Jean-Karl "J. K." Vernay (born 31 October 1987) is a French professional racing driver. He was 2010 Indy Lights and 2017 TCR International Series champion. He has won races at the World Touring Car Cup, where he finished fifth in 2018 and won the WTCR Trophy in 2020.

Career history

Karting
2000 : 3rd in France Cadet Championship
2001 : 5th in Speedy Junior World Cup at the Masters Karting Paris Bercy
2002 : 2nd in Junior Monaco Kart Cup
2004 : 2nd in Belgium Championship, Formula A and 21st in world championship, Formula A

Formula
In 2005, Villeurbanne-born Vernay drove in the French Formula Campus series and finished 1st with 6 wins and 12 podiums on 14 races. The following year, he finished runner-up and best rookies in the French Formula Renault Championship with 7 podiums.

He drove two rounds as race driver in the 2006-07 A1 Grand Prix season and the last round as practice session driver.

In 2007, Jean-Karl was selected to be part of the Red Bull Junior Team program that offers funding and support for promising young drivers. With Tom Dillmann, they were the first French drivers to take part in the programme. Vernay is still a part of the team, along with fellow Frenchman Jean-Éric Vergne.

The same year, he raced in the Formula Three Euroseries with Signature-Plus team finishing 10th. A second place was his best result, with another finish of 3rd in the non-championship Ultimate Masters of Formula 3 at Zolder behind Nico Hülkenberg and team-mate Yann Clairay.

Vernay continued in the series in 2008, continuing with Signature-Plus. He ended up eighth in the championship, with 3 podiums coming at the Norisring, Brands Hatch and Le Mans. He also started his Brands Hatch podium race from pole position, thanks to the series' reverse grid system.

Vernay competed in a third season in 2009 for Signature, with team-mates Mika Mäki and Tiago Geronimi. Vernay finally took his first win in the Euroseries, at the 42nd attempt, winning the sprint race at Hockenheim. He added a second win in the final race of the season, again at Hockenheim, passing Christopher Zanella on the final lap. At the season-ending Macau Grand Prix, Vernay set an outright lap record en route to a victory in the qualifying race, giving him pole position for the main event. However, he lost out to Edoardo Mortara in the main race, after fluffing a gear shift.

Vernay has moved to the United States to race in the Firestone Indy Lights series in 2010 for Sam Schmidt Motorsports. He won in his series debut on the Streets of St. Petersburg in a wet race. He followed this up with another win at Barber Motorsports Park and a third-place finish at Long Beach, leaving him 28 points clear at the top of the standings after 3 rounds. Vernay went on to win four races that season and clinched the championship over James Hinchcliffe with one race to go, having to just start the final round.

Vernay is the first Indy Lights champion since 1996's David Empringham to not go on to compete in IndyCar.

Sports cars and touring cars
In 2011 Vernay was the test and reserve driver for Peugeot Sport, testing the Peugeot 908 on several occasions.

In 2012, Vernay won the Porsche Carrera Cup France driving for Sébastien Loeb Racing. Vernay won the 24 Hours of Le Mans LMGTE Am class in 2013 while competing for IMSA Performance Matmut, driving a Porsche 997 GT3-RSR. He also contested in the full 2013 FIA World Endurance Championship season. In 2014, Vernay will drive for Weider Modulo Dome Racing in Super GT GT500 class.

In 2016, Vernay will drive a W Racing Team Volkswagen Golf at the TCR International Series.

Racing record

Career summary

† As Vernay was a guest driver, he was ineligible for points. 
‡ Team standings.

Complete A1 Grand Prix results
(key)

Complete Formula 3 Euro Series results
(key) (Races in bold indicate pole position) (Races in italics indicate fastest lap)

American open-wheel racing results
(key)  (Races in bold indicate pole position) (Races in italics indicate fastest lap)

Indy Lights

Complete FIA World Endurance Championship results

Complete Porsche Supercup results
(key) (Races in bold indicate pole position) (Races in italics indicate fastest lap)

24 Hours of Le Mans results

Complete European Le Mans Series results
(key) (Races in bold indicate pole position) (Races in italics indicate fastest lap)

Complete Super GT results
(key) (Races in bold indicate pole position) (Races in italics indicate fastest lap)

Complete TCR International Series results
(key) (Races in bold indicate pole position) (Races in italics indicate fastest lap)

† Driver did not finish the race, but was classified as he completed over 75% of the race distance.

Complete World Touring Car Cup results
(key) (Races in bold indicate pole position) (Races in italics indicate fastest lap)

† Driver did not finish the race, but was classified as he completed over 90% of the race distance.

Complete TCR Europe Touring Car Series results
(key) (Races in bold indicate pole position) (Races in italics indicate fastest lap)

References

External links

 Personal web site jkvernay.com
 Career statistic driverdb.com
 Signature Team web site  signature-team.com
 Red Bull Junior Team 2007 redbull-juniorteam.com
 A1GP Driver Statistics results.a1gp.com

1987 births
Living people
People from Villeurbanne
French racing drivers
Formule Campus Renault Elf drivers
Formula 3 Euro Series drivers
A1 Team France drivers
French Formula Renault 2.0 drivers
Formula Renault Eurocup drivers
Indy Lights champions
Indy Lights drivers
French expatriate sportspeople in the United States
World Series Formula V8 3.5 drivers
FIA World Endurance Championship drivers
Porsche Supercup drivers
Blancpain Endurance Series drivers
24 Hours of Le Mans drivers
Super GT drivers
24 Hours of Spa drivers
World Touring Car Cup drivers
24H Series drivers
Sportspeople from Lyon Metropolis
A1 Grand Prix drivers
American Le Mans Series drivers
European Le Mans Series drivers
TCR International Series drivers
TCR Asia Series drivers
Stock Car Brasil drivers
Asian Le Mans Series drivers
Nürburgring 24 Hours drivers
SG Formula drivers
Signature Team drivers
Arrow McLaren SP drivers
Pons Racing drivers
W Racing Team drivers
Phoenix Racing drivers
Karting World Championship drivers
Sébastien Loeb Racing drivers
Audi Sport drivers
La Filière drivers
DAMS drivers
Chinese F4 Championship drivers
Saintéloc Racing drivers
Hyundai Motorsport drivers
Engstler Motorsport drivers
TCR Europe Touring Car Series drivers